When Deng Xiaoping took over as the paramount leader of the People's Republic of China (PRC), he presented himself as a pragmatic contrast to his predecessor Mao, who was more of a theorist and an ideologist. Deng's main goal was to lift people out of poverty and significantly improve the lives of ordinary Chinese people. In justifying opening up and the series of economic reforms that ensued, Deng referred to Marx and his theories, which predicted that nations need to undergo urbanization and a stage of capitalism for a natural socialist transition. One of the most renowned reforms under Deng was establishing four "special economic zones" along the Southeastern coast of China, with Shenzhen, Shantou, and Zhuhai located in Guangdong province and Xiamen located in Fujian province. Special economic zones (SEZs) in mainland China are granted more free market-oriented economic policies and flexible governmental measures by the government of China, compared to the planned economy elsewhere. This allows SEZs to utilize economic management which is more attractive to foreign and domestic businesses. In SEZs, "...foreign and domestic trade and investment are conducted without the authorization of the Chinese central government in Beijing" with "tax and business incentives to attract foreign investment and technology".Trade was originally controlled by China's centralized government. However, these special zones are where market-driven capitalist polices are implemented to entice foreign investments in China. In 1986, China then added 14 additional cities to the list of special economic zones.

History 
In the late 1970s, and especially at the 3rd Plenary Session of the 11th Central Committee of the Chinese Communist Party in December 1978, the Chinese government initiated its policy of reform and opening up, as a response to the failure of Maoist economic policy to produce economic growth which would allow China to be competitive against not only industrialized nations of the west but also rising regional powers: Japan, Korea, Singapore, Taiwan, and Hong Kong. Officials in Guangdong Province led by Provincial Party Secretary Xi Zhongxun seized the initiative, starting with an investment project in Shekou prepared by Yuan Geng on behalf of the Hong Kong-based China Merchants Steam Navigation Company. This project, initially a ship breaking facility, was approved by Li Xiannian on January 31, 1979. In April 1979, Xi Zhongxun and other Guangdong officials presented in Beijing a proposal to give broader flexibility to the coastal provinces of Guangdong and Fujian to attract foreign investment, with additional exemptions in four cities, namely Shenzhen in the Pearl River Delta region, Zhuhai and Shantou in Guangdong and Xiamen (Amoy) in Fujian Province. For these, Chinese Paramount leader Deng Xiaoping coined the name "special zones" with reference to the designation of another border region during the Chinese Civil War. The proposal was approved on July 15 and the four special zones were officially established on August 26, 1979.

In 1984, China further opened 14 coastal cities to overseas investment: Dalian, Qinhuangdao, Tianjin, Yantai, Qingdao, Lianyungang, Nantong, Shanghai, Ningbo, Wenzhou, Fuzhou, Guangzhou, Zhanjiang and Beihai. Since 1988, mainland China's opening to the outside world has been extended to its border areas, areas along the Yangtze River and inland areas. First, the state decided to turn Hainan Island into mainland China's biggest special economic zone (approved by the 1st session of the 7th NPC in 1988) and to enlarge the other four special economic zones.

Shortly afterwards, the State Council expanded the open coastal areas, extending into an open coastal belt the open economic zones of the Yangtze River Delta, Pearl River Delta, Xiamen-Zhangzhou-Quanzhou Triangle in south Fujian, the Shandong Peninsula, the Liaodong Peninsula (in Liaoning Province), Hebei Province and Guangxi autonomous region. In June 1990, the Chinese government opened the Pudong New Area in Shanghai to overseas investment, and additional cities along the Yangtze River valley, with Shanghai's Pudong New Area as its "dragon head."

Since 1992, the State Council has opened a number of border cities and, in addition, all the capital cities of inland provinces and autonomous regions. In addition, 15 free trade zones, 32 state-level economic and technological development zones, and 53 new and high-tech industrial development zones have been established in large and medium-sized cities. As these open areas adopt different preferential policies, they play the dual roles of "windows" in developing the foreign-oriented economy, generating foreign exchanges through exporting products and importing advanced technologies and of "radiators" in accelerating inland economic development.

Primarily geared to exporting processed goods, the five SEZs are foreign trade-oriented areas which integrate science, industry and innovation with trade. Foreign firms benefit from preferential policies, such as lower tax rates, reduced regulations and special managerial systems. In 1999, Shenzhen's new and high-tech industry reached an output value of 81.98 billion yuan, making up 40.5% of the city's total industrial output value.

Since its founding in 1992, the Shanghai Pudong New Area has made progress in both absorbing foreign capital and accelerating the economic development of the Yangtze River valley. The government has extended special preferential policies to the Pudong New Area that are not currently enjoyed by the special economic zones. For instance, in addition to the preferential policies of reducing or eliminating Customs duties and income tax common to the economic and technological development zones, the state also permits the zone to allow foreign business people to open financial institutions and run tertiary industries. In addition, the state has given Shanghai permission to set up a stock exchange, expand its examination and approval authority over investments and allow foreign-funded banks to engage in RMB business. In 1999, the GDP of the Pudong New Area came to 80 billion yuan, and the total industrial output value, 145 billion yuan.

In May 2010, the PRC designated the city of Kashgar in Xinjiang a SEZ. Kashgar's annual growth rate was 17.4 percent in 2009, and Kashgar's designation has since increased tourism and real estate prices in the city. Kashgar is close to China's border with the independent states of former Soviet Central Asia and the SEZ seeks to capitalize on international trade links between China and those states.

In 2015, then-magistrate of Kinmen County (ROC) Chen Fu-hai, along with a non-profit Taiwan organization "with close ties to the CCP", proposed a referendum in which Kinmen would become a special economic zone and obtain free trade and free investment between it and neighboring SEZ Xiamen on the mainland. The plan received controversy due to PRC investment in the ROC being otherwise strictly controlled; it was praised by a Xiamen government official and PRC state media, but the referendum did not receive approval from the government of Taiwan before Chen's term ended in 2018.

List of the SEZs and Open Coastal Cities 
As part of its economic reforms and policy of opening to the world, between 1978 and 1984 China established special economic zones (SEZs) in Shantou, Shenzhen, and Zhuhai in Guangdong Province and Xiamen in Fujian Province as well as designating the entire island province of Hainan as a special economic zone.

In 1984, China opened 14 other coastal cities to overseas investment (listed from north to south): Dalian, Qinhuangdao, Tianjin, Yantai, Qingdao, Lianyungang, Nantong, Shanghai, Ningbo, Wenzhou, Fuzhou, Guangzhou, Zhanjiang, and Beihai. These coastal cities have been designated as the "Open Coastal Cities".

Then, beginning in 1985, the central government expanded the coastal area by establishing the following open economic zones (listed from north to south): the Liaodong Peninsula, Hebei Province (which surrounds Beijing and Tianjin; see Jing-Jin-Ji), the Shandong Peninsula, Yangtze River Delta, Xiamen-Zhangzhou-Quanzhou Triangle in southern Fujian Province, the Pearl River Delta, and Guangxi Zhuang Autonomous Region.

In 1990, the Chinese government decided to open the Pudong New Area in Shanghai to overseas investment, as well as more cities in the Yang Zi River Valley.

Since 1992, the State Council has opened a number of border cities and all the capital cities of inland provinces and autonomous regions. 

In addition 15 free-trade zones, 32 state-level economic and technological development zones, and 53 new and high-tech industrial development zones have been established in large and medium-sized cities. As a result, a multilevel diversified pattern of opening and integrating coastal areas with river, border, and inland areas has been formed in China.

Economic policies of the SEZs 

Special tax incentives for foreign investments in the SEZs.
Greater independence from the central government on international trade activities.
Economic characteristics are represented as "4 principles":
Construction primarily relies on attracting and utilizing foreign capital
Primary economic forms are Sino-foreign joint ventures and partnerships as well as wholly foreign-owned enterprises
Products are primarily export-oriented
Economic activities are primarily driven by market forces

SEZs are listed separately in the national planning (including financial planning) and have province-level authority on economic administration. SEZs local congress and government have authority to legislate.

Leong (2012) investigates the role of special economic zones (SEZs) in liberalizing the Chinese economies and their impact on economic growth. The policy change to a more liberalized economy is identified using SEZ variables as instrumental variables. The results indicate that export and FDI growth have positive and statistically significant effects on economic growth in these countries. The presence of SEZs increases regional growth but increasing the number of SEZs has negligible effect on growth. The key to faster economic growth appears to be a greater pace of liberalization.

A 2022 study in the American Economic Journal found that SEZs in China led to increased human capital investment with improved educational outcomes.

Shenzhen's Economic Transformation 
Out of the special zones, perhaps the most successful was Shenzhen. It transformed from 126 square miles of villages into a business metropolis.  As seen by the table below, the ten years of economic reform from 1980 to 1990 increased population in Shenzhen by six-fold, GDP by around sixty-fold, and Gross Industrial Output by two-hundred fold. Before 1980, Shenzhen's GDP was just 0.2 percent of Hong Kong's. In 2018, the city's GDP hit 2.42 trillion yuan (US $372 billion), overtaking Hong Kong.

Overseas SEZs 
From 1990 to 2018, Chinese enterprises established eleven SEZs in sub-Saharan Africa and the Middle East including: Nigeria (two), Zambia, Djibouti, Kenya, Mauritius, Mauritania, Egypt,  Oman, and Algeria. Generally, the Chinese government takes a hands-off approach, leaving it to Chinese enterprises to work to establish such zones (although it does provide support in the form of grants, loans,  and subsidies, including support via the China Africa Development Fund). Such zones fall within the Chinese policy to go out and compete globally. The Forum on China-Africa Cooperation promotes these SEZs heavily.

The first Chinese overseas SEZs facilitated the offshoring of labor-intensive and less competitive industries, for example in textiles. As Professor Dawn C. Murphy summarizes, these zones now "aim to transfer China's development successes to other countries, increase business opportunities for China manufacturing companies, avoid trade barriers by setting up zones in countries with preferential trade access to important markets, and create a positive business environment for Chinese small and medium-sized enterprises investing in these regions." Overseas SEZs also foster support for China in the international system and help advocate for developing country causes through South-South cooperation. They "help China demonstrate it is acting as a responsible great power in these regions."

Effectiveness and legacy 
Many scholars argue that SEZs played a decisive role in the development of China and the success of Communism as implemented in China. Since their inception, SEZs have contributed 22% of China’s GDP, 45% of total national foreign direct investment, and 60% of exports. SEZs are estimated to have created over 30 million jobs, increased the income of participating farmers by 30%, and accelerated industrialization, agricultural modernization, and urbanization. One of the primary theoretical foundation of SEZs is its ability to cultivate a form of innovation that is uniquely top-down (supported by government) and bottom-up (characterized by local problem solving), while utilizing resources and research at every level. SEZs reflected a desire for Deng Xiaoping's CCP to be experimental, fluid, and localized when implementing Communist reforms.

However, issues like prioritizing the short-term gains, encompassing a limited number of industries, and lack of entrepreneurial promotion are pointed out by critics of the SEZs. Others, like  Gopalakrishnan, point out that "Left out of the picture are inequities in development, arable land loss, real estate speculation and labour violence", as well as significant transparency problems in bureaucracy. Indeed, the aforementioned successes of SEZs in the Chinese economy fail to account for the vast variation in success among the many SEZs, focusing instead on the aggregate effect. This parallels a critique of modern American capitalism, which states that a growing GDP may not be worth the adverse effects regarding an ever-increasing wealth gap.

See also 
 Economy of China
 Megalopolises in China
 New areas
 Special administrative regions of China
Northeast Area Revitalization Plan

Notes

References 
 Chee Kian Leong, 2007, A Tale of Two Countries: Openness and Growth in China and India , Dynamics, Economic Growth, and International Trade (DEGIT) Conference Paper.
 Chee Kian Leong, (forthcoming), Special economic zones and growth in China and India: an empirical investigation, International Economics and Economic Policy.

External links 
Chung-Tong Wu. China's special economic zones: five years later – Asian Journal of Public Administration
Special Economic Zones: Lessons from China by Bhaskar Goswami
Coordination of tax legislation of special zones in Mainland China
Support service to enter development Zones to Mainland China

 
Economic development in China
Industry in China
Trade in China